Neoregelia simulans is a species of flowering plant in the genus Neoregelia. This species is endemic to Brazil.

References

simulans
Flora of Brazil